This is a list of winners and nominees of the Primetime Emmy Award for Outstanding Picture Editing for a Drama Series. This award and Outstanding Picture Editing for a Comedy Series replaced Outstanding Single-Camera Picture Editing for a Series in 2002.

As of 2015, 24 and Breaking Bad are the only shows to have won this award four times.

In the following list, the first titles listed in gold and bold are the winners; those not in gold are nominees, which are listed in alphabetical order. The years given are those in which the ceremonies took place:

Winners and nominations

1960s
Outstanding Individual Achievement in Film Editing

1970s
Outstanding Film Editing for a Series

Outstanding Film Editing for a Drama Series

Outstanding Film Editing for a Series

1980s

Outstanding Single-Camera Picture Editing for a Series

1990s

2000s

Outstanding Single-Camera Picture Editing for a Drama Series

2010s

2020s

Editors with multiple awards

3 awards
 M. Pam Blumenthal 
 Chris G. Willingham

2 awards
 Samuel E. Beetley
 Andrew Chulack 
 Gene Fowler
 Marjorie Fowler
 Jon Koslowsky 
 David Latham
 Neil Mandelberg 
 Thomas R. Moore 
 Randy Jon Morgan 
 Bill Mosher 
 Tim Porter
 Lynne Willingham

Programs with multiple awards

4 awards
 24 (3 consecutive)
 Breaking Bad (2 consecutive, twice)

3 awards
 ER
 Game of Thrones (2 consecutive)

2 awards
 Hill Street Blues (consecutive)
 Lost
 Moonlighting (consecutive)

Editors with multiple nominations

9 nominations
 Kelley Dixon

6 nominations
 Fred W. Berger
 Ray Daniels
 Skip Macdonald
 Christopher Nelson
 Stanford Tischler

5 nominations
 Jeanene Ambler 
 Kevin Casey 
 Randy Jon Morgan 
 Stephen Semel
 Chris G. Willingham

4 nominations
 Roger Bondelli 
 Mark Goldman
 David Latham
 Larry L. Mills 
 Tim Porter
 William B. Stich 
 Katie Weiland
 Sidney Wolinsky

3 nominations
 M. Pam Blumenth
 Joseph Dervin
 Henk Van Eeghen
 Heather MacDougall 
 Wendy Hallam Martin 
 Chris McCaleb
 Cindy Mollo
 Thomas R. Moore
 Bill Mosher
 Philip Carr Neel
 Scott Powell
 Donald R. Rode
 Alec Smight
 Robert Watts
 Lynne Willingham
 Tom Wilson
 Dean Zimmerman

2 nominations
 Janet Ashikaga
 Samuel E. Beetley
 Henry Berman
 Sarah Boyd
 Richard Bracken

 Maryann Brandon
 William T. Cartwright 
 Robert A. Daniels
 Andrew S. Eisen 
 Ken Eluto
 Dylan Firshein 
 Joe Ann Fogle 
 Gene Fowler
 Marjorie Fowler
 John C. Fuller
 James Galloway 
 Conrad M. Gonzalez 
 Crispin Green
 Jim Gross
 William Gulick 
 James T. Heckert 
 Arthur David Hilton 
 Douglas Hines
 Bill Johnson
 Sidney Katz
 Jon Koslowsky 
 Briana London 
 Susanne Malles
 Neil Mandelberg 
 Stephen Mark
 Pattye Rogers 
 Jeff Seibenick 
 Andrew Seklir
 Douglas Stewart
 Larry Strong
 Neil Travis
 Leo Trombetta 
 Ron Volk
 J. Terry Williams

Programs with multiple nominations

11 nominations
 Game of Thrones
 The Sopranos
 24

10 nominations
 Breaking Bad
 ER

8 nominations
 Mad Men
 The X-Files

7 nominations
 Lost
 The Mandalorian

6 nominations
 Better Call Saul
 Hill Street Blues
 L.A. Law
 The West Wing

5 nominations
 Chicago Hope
 Stranger Things

4 nominations
 Cagney & Lacey
 Dallas
 Mission: Impossible
 Roots
 Succession

3 nominations
 China Beach
 Dexter
 The Handmaid's Tale
 Law & Order
 Miami Vice
 Moonlighting
 Northern Exposure
 NYPD Blue
 Ozark
 The West Wing

2 nominations
 Alias
 Amazing Stories
 Battlestar Galactica
 The Bold Ones: The Senator
 Boston Legal
 The Crown
 Dynasty
 Fame
 Heroes
 House of Cards
 Lou Grant
 The Man from U.N.C.L.E.
 Medical Story
 Quincy, M.E.
 Rich Man, Poor Man
 Severance
 Skag
 Star Trek
 Star Trek: The Next Generation
 The Streets of San Francisco
 Thirtysomething

References

Camera Picture Editing for a Drama Series